Bucculatrix praecipua is a moth in the  family Bucculatricidae. It is found in South Africa. It was described by Edward Meyrick in 1918.

References

Natural History Museum Lepidoptera generic names catalog

Endemic moths of South Africa
Bucculatricidae
Moths described in 1918
Taxa named by Edward Meyrick
Moths of Africa